Stormklockan (Swedish: The storm clock) was a political youth magazine published in Stockholm, Sweden, between 1908 and 1985.

History and profile
Stormklockan was launched in December 1908 in Stockholm. Zeth Höglund was instrumental in the establishment of the magazine which was started as a weekly social democratic publication. Soon after its start the magazine was made the official media outlet of the Social Democratic Youth. Höglund served as its editor-in-chief. One of the contributors in this period was Allan Wallenius, a Swede from Turku.

Over time the magazine left its original ideology and adopted a socialist stance. During its existence it was published by different groups, including Social Democratic Youth, Young Left, Marxist–Leninist Struggle League and Red Youth. In 1917 Stormklockan was seized several times due to its close alliance with the Social Democratic Party. The magazine folded in 1985.

References

External links

1908 establishments in Sweden
1985 disestablishments in Sweden
Defunct magazines published in Sweden
Magazines established in 1908
Magazines disestablished in 1985
Magazines published in Stockholm
Political magazines published in Sweden
Swedish-language magazines
Weekly magazines published in Sweden
Communist magazines
Youth magazines